The Svelgfoss Power Station  is a hydroelectric power station located at the Tinnelva river in Notodden, Vestfold og Telemark, Norway.

At its commissioning in 1907, the power station was the largest in Europe and the second largest at the world. It was used to provide electric power to the fertilizer plant in Notodden. In July 2015, the whole complex, the Rjukan–Notodden Industrial Heritage Site, was designated a World Heritage Site.

See also

References 

Hydroelectric power stations in Norway
Buildings and structures in Vestfold og Telemark
Notodden
Energy infrastructure completed in 1907
1907 establishments in Norway